Rocky Cape may refer to:

 Rocky Cape, Tasmania, a locality in Tasmania, Australia
 Rocky Cape National Park, a national park in Tasmania